Drue is a name. Notable people with this name include:

Surname
 Kerry Drue, American lawyer
 Thomas Drue (1586–1627), English playwright

Given name
 Drue Chrisman (born 1997), American football player
 Drue Cressener Cressener (1642–1718), English clergyman
 Drue Drury (courtier) (1531–1617), English courtier
 Sir Drue Drury, 1st Baronet (1588–1632), English MP
 Drue Heinz (1915–2018), American actress
 Drue Kataoka, Japanese visual artist
 Drue Le Guier (born 1959), Australian swimmer
 Drue Leyton (1903–1997), American actress and member of the French Resistance
 Drue Pearce (born 1951), American businesswoman and politician
 Drue Smith (died 2001), American journalist
 Drue Tranquill (born 1995), American football player
 Drue Vitter (1942–2004), American politician

See also
 Drew (name)